Legislative elections were held in Guam on Tuesday, November 8, 2016, along with the election for the Guam delegate to the U.S. House of Representatives. The Democratic Party won nine of the fifteen seats in the Legislature and maintained control of Guam's delegate seat. The fifteen elected members of the 34th Guam Legislature were inaugurated on January 2, 2017.

Results

Legislature

Candidates

Democratic

Eliminated

Republican

Eliminated

Primary Election
The members are elected at-large with the first 15 winning candidates are elected as the new members of the legislature. As there were many candidates running, primaries were set on August 27, 2016 for both the Democratic and Republican parties. The first fifteen candidates who win the highest votes go on to the General election.

Democratic Party Primary

Eliminated candidates
Two Democratic hopefuls were eliminated in the 2016 primaries:
Victor Gaza 
Armando Dominguez

Republican Party Primary

Eliminated candidates
Two Republican hopefuls were eliminated in the 2016 primaries:
Barry Mead
Ellery Paz

General election results
Following the primaries, there were 26 candidates vying for the 15 seats in the Legislature of Guam. The members are elected at-large with the first 15 winning candidates elected as the new members of the legislature.

Incoming Senators to the 34th Guam Legislature
There were 15 senators elected on November 8, 2016 to serve in the 34th Guam Legislature and were inaugurated on January 2, 2017:

Democratic

Incumbents

Freshman

Republican

Incumbents

Freshman

References

2016 in Guam
Legislative elections in Guam
2016 Guam elections